Simon Gachet (born 14 October 1993) is a French racing driver who currently competes in the GT World Challenge Europe Sprint Cup for Tresor by Car Collection.

Career

Early career
An avid rugby player as a young boy, Gachet was not heavily involved with motorsports in his youth. He was introduced to motorsport through car magazines, and discovered single-seater racing while attending the Formula Motorsport school at the Circuit du Laquais. In 2011, he began competing in the V de V Challenge Monoplace, completely forgoing the karting process.

Junior formulae
In his opening season of single-seater competition, Gachet was crowned champion, taking two wins and 11 podiums in 15 races. That winter, Gachet won the Euroformula Volant test, awarding him a €60,000 bursary which allowed him to compete in the French F4 Championship for 2012. Scoring six podiums in 14 races, Gachet finished third in the overall points classification. For 2013, Gachet stepped up to the Formula Renault 2.0 Alps series, joining French team ARTA Engineering. He had a quiet start in his first season in the series, scoring his first points in July at Misano and finishing 14th in the championship. He returned to the team in 2014, adding a full-season effort in the Formula Renault Eurocup to his Alps series commitment. Gachet's second season in the Alps series proved more successful, as he scored a podium in each of his first three races en route to a 5th-place finish in the championship. Prior to the Hungaroring round of the 2014 Eurocup Formula Renault 2.0 season, Gachet joined ART Junior Team. He would finish the Eurocup season in 19th, scoring just 10 points. For 2015, he joined Tech 1 Racing for a full-season campaign in the Formula Renault Eurocup, topping the charts in the series' preseason tests at MotorLand Aragón. However, it was another quiet season for Gachet, securing just one podium at Le Mans and finishing 16th overall.

Sports car racing
For 2016, Gachet moved to endurance racing, joining Panis Barthez Competition's entry into the LMP3 class of the European Le Mans Series. The entry scored its first and only podium of the season at Imola, before taking pole position the following week at the Red Bull Ring. Entering five of the six races that season, Gachet and co-drivers Eric Debard and Valentin Moineault finished 9th in the LMP3 class championship. He returned to the team in 2017, finishing 14th in the drivers' championship. Alongside his European Le Mans Series campaign, Gachet joined Energy by ART's entry into the GT4 European Series Southern Cup, taking one podium at Magny-Cours en route to a 20th-place finish in the Pro-Am class championship. Gachet completed 2017 with a pair of one-off appearances for Saintéloc Racing in the GT World Challenge Europe Sprint and Endurance cups, finishing outside of the points in both appearances.

2018 saw Gachet move full-time into the GT World Challenge Europe with Saintéloc. Pairing with Christopher Haase in the Sprint Cup, Gachet scored three overall podiums, including a second-placed finish at Hungaroring, placing eighth in the championship. Gachet began the Endurance Cup season with Saintéloc's Pro entry, scoring a sixth-place finish at Circuit Paul Ricard before joining the team's Am-class entry for the Spa 24 Hours. He would finish 37th in the overall Endurance Cup classification. He returned to the team in both championships for 2019, joining Haase once again in the Sprint Cup and returning to the team's Pro-class entry in the Endurance Cup. Gachet and Haase had their best statistical season to date, finishing fifth in the championship after taking four podiums and Gachet's first win in the series at Zandvoort. He had another quiet season in the Endurance Cup, finishing 33rd overall.

Gachet played a diminished role for the team in 2020, joining Steven Palette in Saintéloc's Silver-class Sprint Cup entry. The duo found immediate success, taking class victory in the opening two races of the season and adding a podium to complete the opening weekend at Misano. The following round at Magny-Cours saw Gachet take the overall pole and victory in race #2, despite being classified in the Silver Cup class. Following the second race at the Circuit de Barcelona-Catalunya, Gachet and Palette clinched the Silver Cup title. The following season saw Gachet switch his focus back to the Endurance Cup, joining Mercedes-AMG entrant AKKA-ASP in their Silver Cup entry. Claiming class victories at Paul Ricard and Barcelona, Gachet finished second in the Silver class championship alongside teammates Konstantin Tereshchenko and Thomas Drouet.

For 2022, Gachet returned to Audi, joining Tresor by Car Collection's Sprint Cup entry. Reunited with Christopher Haase, Gachet scored his first podium of the season at Magny-Cours after taking pole for race #1. He would go on to collect four podium finishes that season, claiming third in the overall championship. Gachet also embarked on full-season campaigns in the FFSA GT Championship and GT4 European Series for Akkodis-ASP. In October, he joined Eric Debard behind the wheel of Team France's GT Relay entry into the 2022 FIA Motorsport Games. The duo finished second in both qualifying races, before scoring the gold medal in the main race.

In 2023, Gachet was promoted to Audi Sport factory driver status. In his first full season as a factory driver, Gachet took on a drive with Saintéloc's Pro class entry in the GT World Challenge Europe Endurance Cup, alongside Patric Niederhauser and Christopher Mies, as well as a Sprint Cup entry in the Gold Cup class, paired with Paul Evrard.

Racing record

Career summary 

† As Gachet was a guest driver, he was ineligible for championship points.* Season still in progress.

Complete GT World Challenge Europe results

GT World Challenge Europe Endurance Cup

Complete GT World Challenge Europe Sprint Cup results
(key) (Races in bold indicate pole position) (Races in italics indicate fastest lap)

* Season still in progress.

References

External links
Simon Gachet at SnapLap
Simon Gachet at Motorsport.com

1993 births
Living people
French racing drivers
French F4 Championship drivers
Formula Renault Eurocup drivers
Formula Renault 2.0 Alps drivers
European Le Mans Series drivers
Blancpain Endurance Series drivers
24H Series drivers
People from Bourgoin-Jallieu
Sportspeople from Isère
Auto Sport Academy drivers
ART Grand Prix drivers
Tech 1 Racing drivers
Audi Sport drivers
R-ace GP drivers
FIA Motorsport Games drivers
Saintéloc Racing drivers
GT4 European Series drivers